Galeandra baueri is a species of orchid. It is the type species of the genus Galeandra.

References

External links 

baueri